3Com 3c509 is a line of Ethernet IEEE 802.3 network cards for the ISA, EISA, MCA and PCMCIA computer buses. It was designed by 3Com, and put on the market in 1994.

Features
The 3Com 3c5x9 family of network controllers has various interface combinations of computer bus including ISA, EISA, MCA and PCMCIA. For network connection, 10BASE-2, AUI and 10BASE-T are used.

B = On ISA and PCMCIA adapter numbers indicates that these adapters are part of the second generation of the Parallel Tasking EtherLink III technology.

The DIP-28 (U1) EPROM  for network booting may be 8, 16 or 32 kByte size. This means EPROMs of type 64, 128, 256 kbit (2^10) are compatible, like the 27C256.

Boot ROM address is located between 0xC0000 - 0xDE000.

Teardown example, the 3c509B-Combo
The Etherlink III 3C509B-Combo is registered with the FCC ID DF63C509B. The main components on the card is Y1: crystal oscillator 20 MHz, U50: coaxial transceiver interface DP8392, U4: main controller 3Com 9513S (or 9545S etc.), U6:  70 ns CMOS static RAM, U1: DIP-28 27C256 style EPROM for boot code, U3: 1024 bit 5V CMOS Serial EEPROM (configuration).

Label:
  Etherlink III
  (C) 1994 3C509B-C
  ALL RIGHTS RESERVED
  ASSY 03-0021-001 REV-A
  FCC ID: DF63C509B

Barcode:
  EA=0020AFDCC34C
  SN=6AHDCC34C
  MADE IN U.S.A.

R = Resistor
C = Capacitor
L = Inductance
Q = Transistor
CR = Transistor
FL = Transformer
T = Transformer
U = Integrated circuit
J = Jumper or connector
VR
F

FL70: Pulse transformer
  bel9509 A
  0556-3873-03
  * HIPOTTED

Y1: 20 MHz crystal
  20.000M
     652DA

U50:
  P9512BR
  DP8392CN
  Coaxial Transceiver Interface

T50: Pulse transformer, pinout: 2x8
  VALOR
  ST7033

x00: Pulse transformer
  VALOR
   PT0018
   CHINA M
   9449 C

U4: Plastic package 33x33 pins
  Parallel Tasking TM
  3Com
  40-0130-002
  9513S 22050553
  AT&T 40-01302
Another chip with the same function:
  40-0130-003
  9545S 48324401
  AT&T 40-01303

U6: 8192 x 8-bit 70 ns CMOS static RAM
  HY 6264A
  LJ-70
  9509B KOREA
Another chip with the same function:
  CY6264-70OSC (photo)

U1: Boot ROM
  DIP-28 EPROM
  8,16, or 32 kB (27/28C256) for boot code.

U3: 256 Bit/1K 5.0V CMOS Serial EEPROM
  B 52AH
   93C46
   M8

Q41: N-Channel Logic level Power MOSFET 60V, 11A, 107 mΩ (using ASSY 03-0021-004 due to obscured view)
  F3055L
  96   45
  (H)H

VR41: 3-Terminal 0.5 A Negative Voltage Regulator (-5V) in D2PAK
  KA79
  M05

ASSY 03-0021-004 REV-B has written on it: U.S. Patents: 

Connector for the computer bus: ISA 16-bit

Connections for networking: 10BASE-T (8P8C), AUI (DA-15), 10BASE2 (BNC)

Driver setup 
Some of the possible ISA I/O bases are 0x280, 0x300, 0x310, 0x320, 0x330, 0x340, 0x350. And IRQ 5, 7, 9, 10, 11, 12. The driver for OpenBSD, NetBSD and FreeBSD is "ep"; for Linux it is "eth".

Patents 

The patent describes a method where a data transfer counter triggers a threshold logic that generates an early indication or interrupt signal before the transfer is completed. The adapter also writes timing information into status registers such that a device driver can optimize for any latency.

Uses
 PC/TCP Packet Driver for use with MS-DOS or PC DOS on X86
 Amiga networking (Miami Network Interface MNI, gg2-3c509.mni)

See also
 AMD Lance Am7990 - 1985, AMD Am7990 network chip
 NE2000 - 1987, Novell's NE2000 network card
 RTL8139 - 1999, Realtek 8139 PCI network chip

References

External links
 jaapsch.net - 27C256 256K (32K x 8) CMOS EPROM
 PIC18F452 and 3COM 3C509B Ethernet ISA card, Controlling an ISA 16-bit network card with a PIC18F452
 Workaround to install NE2000 / 3C509 Non Plug&Play ISA Network Adapters (2002)

Networking hardware
Integrated circuits